This is a list of notable people whose lives were significantly associated with Albany County, New York.

Chronological list

18th century
 Peter Van Brugh Livingston (1710–1792), born in Albany; politician who supported the American Revolution; presiding officer of the first New York provincial congress in 1775
 Philip Livingston (1716–1778), born in Albany; local merchant; delegate to the Continental Congress; signer of the Declaration of Independence
 William Livingston (1723–1790), born in Albany; newspaper publisher; member of the Continental Congress; first Governor of New Jersey
 Henry Bogart (1729–1821), signer of the Sons of Liberty Constitution in 1766; elected representative of the first ward on the Albany Committee of Correspondence
 Abraham Cuyler (1742–1810), born in Albany; former mayor of Albany, merchant, land owner and British loyalist
 John Tayler (1742–1829), businessman and politician; represented Albany County in the New York State Assembly (1777–1779, 1780–1781, and 1785–1787); appointed City Recorder (Deputy Mayor) of Albany in 1793; justice of the Court of Common Pleas in 1797; represented Albany in the New York Senate 1802–1813; Lieutenant Governor (1811-1822); Acting Governor in 1817; died in Albany and is buried in Albany Rural Cemetery in Menands
 Peter W. Yates (1747–1826), lawyer and Continental Congressman; grew up in Albany and developed a prosperous legal practice there; served on the Albany City Council and in the county militia at the start of the American Revolution; represented Albany in the New York State Assembly and the Continental Congress
 Peter Gansevoort (1749–1812); colonel in the Continental Army during the American Revolutionary War; born and died in Albany
 Isaac Mitchell (1759–1812), born in Albany; journalist, author, and editor of the Poughkeepsie Guardian, Albany Republican Crisis, and Poughkeepsie Republican Herald
 Alexander Boyd (1764–1857), U.S. Congressman; born in Albany
 James Cochran (1769–1848), U.S. Congressman from New York; journalist; born in Albany
 Jacob Cuyler (1773–1854), born in Albany; British officer involved in the settlement of the 1820 Settlers to the Eastern Cape, South Africa
 Harmanus Bleecker (1779–1849), U.S. Congressman; born in Albany
 Herman Knickerbocker (1779–1855), U.S. Congressman; born in Albany
 John Duer (1782–1858), born in Albany; jurist; author; chief judge of New York Superior Court
 Harmanus Peek (1782–1838), born in Albany; U.S. Congressman from New York
 Gerrit Y. Lansing (1783–1862), born in Albany; U.S. Congressman; bank and insurance company president
 John K. Kane (1795–1858), born in Albany; politician, attorney, and jurist
 Joseph Henry (1797–1878), born in Albany; inventor of low- and high-resistance galvanometers; first secretary of the Smithsonian Institution

19th century
Luther Tucker (1802–1873), Publisher of The Cultivator and Country Gentleman
Henry B. Metcalfe (1805–1881), born in Albany; prosecuting attorney, judge, and US Congressman from New York
John McKeon (1808–1883), born in Albany; district attorney for New York County and Southern New York; US Congressman from New York
Rufus Wheeler Peckham (1809–1873), lawyer, judge, and U.S. congressman; born in Rensselaerville; the county's district attorney, 1838–1841; served on the New York Supreme Court, Third Judicial District (1861–1869) seated in Albany, then on the New York Court of Appeals (1870–1873); was lost at sea; his cenotaph is in Albany Rural Cemetery in Menands
William Henry Bogart (1810–1888), member of the New York Legislature; author
Henry James, Sr. (1811–1882), born in Albany; Swedenborgian theologian; father of William James, Henry James, and Alice James
William Page (1811–1885), born in Albany; considered the leading American painter of his time
Gilbert R. Spalding (1812–1880), showman and circus owner
Robert Carter (1819–1879), born in Albany; author and editor; involved in the foundation of the Republican Party
John Pitkin Norton (1822–1852), born in Albany; chemist and educator; helped found the Sheffield Scientific School
Abraham Oakey Hall (1826–1898), born in Albany; mayor of New York City; author
Joseph Bradford Carr (1828–1895), born in Albany; Union Army general; Secretary of State of New York
Roscoe Conkling (1829–1888), United States Congressman and United States Senator from New York; born in Albany
Emily Sullivan Oakey (1829–1883), born in Albany; educator, author, poet, hymnist
William Jermyn Florence (1831–1891), born in Albany; actor; comedian; improvisationalist
Daniel Manning (1831–1887), born in Albany; journalist and later United States Secretary of the Treasury
Wheeler Hazard Peckham (1833–1905), lawyer and defeated nominee to the U.S. Supreme Court; son of Rufus Wheeler Peckham (1809-1873); born in Albany and graduated from the Albany Academy; buried in Albany Rural Cemetery in Menands
Homer Dodge Martin (1836–1897), born in Albany; painter whose talent was not recognized until his death
Rufus Wheeler Peckham (1838–1909), New York state court judge and U.S. Supreme Court justice; son of Rufus Wheeler Peckham (1809–1873); born in Albany; graduated from the Albany Academy; district attorney of Albany County (1869–1872); practiced law privately in Albany and served as counsel to the city; served on the New York Supreme Court in Albany (1883–1886) and the New York Court of Appeals (1886–1896); buried in Albany Rural Cemetery in Menands
James Montgomery Bailey (1841–1894), journalist and author; founder of newspapers Danbury News and Danbury Evening News; native of Albany
Herman Bendell (1843–1932), physician; Civil War surgeon; Superintendent of Indian Affairs Arizona Territory; American Consul Elsinore, Denmark; native of Albany
James Campbell Matthews (1844–1930), New York's first African-American law school graduate and judge of Albany's Recorder's Court
Joseph R. Grismer (1849–1922), actor, playwright and theatrical producer; born in Albany
William Bliss Baker (1856–1886), landscape artist in the Realism movement; had a studio in Albany 1881–1886, when he died
Lucy Stedman Lamson (1857-1926), business woman, educator
Alice Ames Winter (1865–1944), litterateur, author and clubwoman
Nanette Comstock (1866–1942), born in Albany, stage actress
Learned Hand (1872–1961), United States judge and judicial philosopher; the most cited and quoted Federal judge not to sit on the Supreme Court
John Rathbone Oliver (1872–1943), born in Albany; psychiatrist, medical historian, author, and priest; his novel Victim and Victor was a contender for the 1929 Pulitzer Prize for Fiction
Cy Seymour (1872–1919), native of Albany, major league baseball player
William Barnes Sr., attorney and Republican Party organizer
Theobald Smith (1859–1934), born in Albany; epidemiologist, bacteriologist, pathologist and professor who discovered a species of Salmonella, Babesia, and showed that tuberculosis could jump from animals to humans

20th century
Norman C. Armitage (1907, as Norman Cudworth Cohn–1972), Olympic medalist saber fencer
 Emanuel Rackman (1910–2008), born in Albany, Modern Orthodox rabbi; President of Bar-Ilan University
Andy Rooney (1919–2011), radio and television writer; 60 Minutes
Howard C. Nolan, Jr. (b. 1932), former member of the New York State Senate
Martha Quinn (b. 1959), an original video jockey on MTV
Israel Tsvaygenbaum (b. 1961), Russian-American artist
Ann Curless (b. 1963), Exposé singer
Kirsten Gillibrand (b. 1966), current U.S. Senator from New York since 2009; born in Albany
Philip Amelio (1977–2005), actor and teacher; graduated from the University at Albany and received a master's degree in education from The College of Saint Rose in Albany
William Barnes Jr., Newspaper publisher and Republican Party leader
Anthony Vinciquerra (b.1954), former CEO of Fox Networks and current CEO of Sony Pictures Entertainment, born in Albany.
Talor Battle (b.1988), basketball player who is currently an assistant coach for Northwestern Wildcats
Kevin Huerter (b.1998), National Basketball Association (NBA) player for the Sacramento Kings

Alphabetical index
Philip Amelio (1977–2005)
James Montgomery Bailey (1841–1894)
William Bliss Baker (1856–1886)
William Barnes Jr. (1866–1930)
William Barnes Sr. (1824–1913)
Talor Battle, basketball player who last played for Hapoel Tel Aviv of the Israeli League
Herman Bendell (1843–1932)
Harmanus Bleecker (1779–1849)
William Henry Bogart (1810–1888)
Alexander Boyd (1764–1857)
Joseph Bradford Carr (1828–1895)
Robert Carter (1819–1879)
James Cochran (1769–1848)
Roscoe Conkling (1829–1888)
John Duer (1782–1858)
William Jermyn Florence (1831–1891)
Peter Gansevoort (1749–1812)
Abraham Oakey Hall (1826–1898)
Learned Hand (1872–1961)
Joseph Henry (1797–1878)
Henry James, Sr. (1811–1882)
John K. Kane (1795–1858)
Herman Knickerbocker (1779–1855)
Gerrit Y. Lansing (1783–1862)
Peter Van Brugh Livingston (1710–1792)
Philip Livingston (1716–1778)
William Livingston (1723–1790)
Daniel Manning (1831–1887)
Homer Dodge Martin (1836–1897)
John McKeon (1808–1883)
Henry B. Metcalfe (1805–1881)
Isaac Mitchell (1759–1812)
Howard C. Nolan, Jr. (b. 1932)
John Pitkin Norton (1822–1852)
William Page (1811–1885)
Rufus Wheeler Peckham (1809–1873)
Rufus Wheeler Peckham (1838–1909)
Wheeler Hazard Peckham (1833–1905)
Harmanus Peek (1782–1838)
Cy Seymour (1872–1919)
John Tayler (1742–1829)
Peter W. Yates (1747–1826)

References

Albany County